Hagia Sophia is a UNESCO World Heritage Site in Istanbul, Turkey. It was built in 537 as the Greek Orthodox patriarchal cathedral, later becoming a Roman Catholic cathedral, then a Sunni mosque, then a museum. It currently functions as a mosque.

Hagia Sophia or Saint Sophia may also refer to:

The Greek for Holy Wisdom, a concept in Christian theology

Churches

Australia
 Saint Sophia Cathedral, Sydney (1928), a Greek Orthodox cathedral in Paddington, Sydney, New South Wales
 St Sophia Greek Orthodox Church, a Greek Orthodox church in Surry Hills, Sydney, New South Wales

Belarus
 Saint Sophia Cathedral in Polotsk (11th century), a cathedral in Polotsk

Bulgaria
 Saint Sofia Church, Sofia (6th century), a church in Sofia
 Hagia Sophia Church, Nesebar (9th century), a church in Nesebar

China
 Saint Sophia Cathedral, Harbin (1907), a church in Daoli, Harbin City, Heilongjiang Province

Cyprus
 Saint Sophia Cathedral, Nicosia (11th century), a former church in Nicosia; now a mosque since 1570

Greece
 Hagia Sophia (8th century), a church in Thessaloniki
 Hagia Sophia (10th century), a church in Drama
 Hagia Sophia (12th century), a church in Monemvasia
 Hagia Sophia (14th century), a church in Mystras

North Macedonia
Saint Sophia, Ohrid (9th century), a church in Ohrid

Russia
 Saint Sophia Church, Moscow (17th century), a church in Moscow
 Nikolskaya Church (1813), a church in Kamenki, Nizhny Novgorod Oblast
 Saint Sophia Cathedral in Novgorod (11th century), a church in Novgorod
 St. Sophia Cathedral, Pushkin (1788), a cathedral in Pushkin, St Petersburg
 Saint Sophia Cathedral, Vologda (1570), a Russian Orthodox cathedral in Vologda

Turkey
 Little Hagia Sophia (6th century), originally a church in Istanbul, now a mosque
 Hagia Sophia, Iznik (6th century), originally a church in Nicaea, now a mosque 
 Hagia Sophia, Trabzon (13th century), originally a church in Trabzon, now a mosque

Ukraine
 Saint Sophia Cathedral, Kyiv (11th century), a church in Kiev
 Saint Sophia Cathedral, Zhytomyr (1748), a cathedral in the Roman Catholic Diocese of Kyiv-Zhytomyr

United Kingdom
 Saint Sophia (London) (1882), a cathedral in London

United States
 Saint Sophia (Los Angeles) (1952), a cathedral in Los Angeles
 St. Sophia Greek Orthodox Cathedral (1948), a cathedral in Miami
 Saint Sophia Cathedral (Washington, D.C.) (1951), a cathedral in Washington, D.C.

Other uses
 SS Sussex, an 1896 cross-English Channel passenger ferry also known as Aghia Sophia

See also
 Ayasofya Mosque (disambiguation)
 Sancta Sophia College, University of Sydney, Australia
 Sofia (disambiguation)
 Sofia Church (disambiguation)
 Sophia (disambiguation)
 Santa Sofia (disambiguation)